Kevin Manuel Rivera Allende (born February 10, 1998), known by his stage name Kevvo (stylized as KEVVO), is a Puerto Rican singer and rapper.

He first came to prominence with his song 105F, which included a remix with multiple notable reggaeton artists such as Ñengo Flow, Myke Towers, Darell, Chencho Corleone, Arcángel and Farruko. The video surpassed 50 million views on YouTube one month after its release.

Origins 

He said that some of his  inspirations were Cosculluela, Daddy Yankee, Arcángel, Ñengo Flow, and Farruko, because he grew up hearing their music.

Kevvo said in Spanish talking about his origins:

Controversies 

In 2019, he had a diss battle with fellow Puerto Rican rapper Omy de Oro. Kevvo said in the Ecoween event in Eco Sports Park, "Subimos de rango un carajo", making reference of one of Omy's songs, which made him angry. Omy came to Kevvo, hit him in the face and got this sunglasses. Both artists were accompanied with bodyguards from their shows for safety reasons.

In another incident, this time in 2020, one of his songs was leaked that contained material that some considered to be dissing fellow Puerto Rican rappers Eladio Carrión and Ozuna, but that was later proven false. The controversy came when he made a statement in a line saying "Tocame y te dejo flow Prichard Colón, jodio." People were offended by that line due to a dilemma the boxer faced when an illegal puch to the back of the head caused him a cerebral hemorrhage, he later fell in coma for almost a year, and now he is healing although he is still in a vegatative state. Kevvo later apologized for the comment.

Discography

Studio albums 

 2021: Cotidiano

Singles as lead artist 

 5:12
 105F
 O.V.E.R.
 Hijueputismo (ft. Ñengo Flow)
 Rastri (ft. Marvel Boy)
 Crossfit (Ft. Randy)
 105F Remix (ft. Farruko, Arcángel, Myke Towers, Darell, Ñengo Flow, Brytiago, Chencho Corleone)
 Farandulera
 Mini Mini
 2020
 POWER (ft. Myke Towers, Jhay Cortez, Darell)
 Tyson
 Billetes azules (Ft. J Balvin)
 No Lo Niegues (Ft. Jay Wheeler)
 Te Va Bien (with Becky G and Arcángel ft. Darell)
Por el asterisco (with Faraón Love Shady)

Singles as featuring artist 

 Jukiao Remix (Anonimus and Marvel Boy ft. Kevvo, Juanka, Pablo Chill-E)
 Crossfit (Randy ft. Kevvo)
 Groupie (Casper Magico, Kevvo)
 Muévelo (Hozwal ft. Kevvo)
 El Efecto (Remix) (Rauw Alejandro, Chencho Corleone, and Kevvo featuring Bryant Myers, Lyanno, and Dalex)
 Pa' que te casaste (Brray, Kevvo, Randy)
 La High (Gotay "El Autentiko" ft. Kevvo)
 En La High (Pacho "El Antifeka", Brray, Kevvo)
 Groupie Remix (Casper Magico and Kevvo ft. Pablo Chill-E, Juanka, Brray, Luigi 21 Plus)
 Perreo intenso (Farruko, Ankhal, Kevvo, Guaynaa)
 Natti, Karol, Becky (Jon Z, Kevvo)
 Actúa (Yandel, Ñengo Flow, Kevvo)
 Booty Call (Darell ft. Kevvo)

References 

1998 births
Living people
People from Toa Baja, Puerto Rico
21st-century Puerto Rican male singers
Puerto Rican reggaeton musicians
Puerto Rican rappers